Francisco Javier 'Pichu' Atienza Valverde (born 18 January 1990) is a Spanish professional footballer who plays for Greek Super League club Asteras Tripolis as a central defender.

Club career
Atienza was born in Cañete de las Torres, Córdoba, Andalusia, and joined Atlético Madrid's youth setup in 2003. After making his senior debut for the C-team in Tercera División, he was promoted to the reserves in 2008, spending several campaigns in Segunda División B.

On 18 July 2011 Atienza joined another reserve team, Sevilla Atlético also in the third level. He continued to appear in the category in the following years, representing SD Huesca and Hércules CF.

On 7 July 2016, Atienza signed a two-year contract with CF Reus Deportiu, newly promoted to Segunda División. He made his professional debut on 20 August, starting in a 1–0 away win against RCD Mallorca.

On 16 June 2018, Atienza signed a two-year contract with fellow second division side CD Numancia. On 4 July of the following year, he agreed to a three-year deal with Real Zaragoza, still in the second level.

On 7 July 2021, Pichu was announced by the Greek Super League side Asteras Tripolis, on a contract until June 2023.

Honours
Spain U17
UEFA European Under-17 Championship: 2007

References

External links

1990 births
Living people
Sportspeople from the Province of Córdoba (Spain)
Spanish footballers
Spanish expatriate footballers
Expatriate footballers in Greece
Spanish expatriate sportspeople in Greece
Footballers from Andalusia
Association football defenders
Segunda División players
Segunda División B players
Tercera División players
Atlético Madrid C players
Atlético Madrid B players
Sevilla Atlético players
SD Huesca footballers
Hércules CF players
CF Reus Deportiu players
CD Numancia players
Real Zaragoza players
Asteras Tripolis F.C. players
Super League Greece players
Spain youth international footballers